The World Group Play-offs were four ties which involves the losing nations of the World Group first round and the winning nations of the World Group II. Nations that win their play-off ties entered the 2017 World Group, while losing nations joined the 2017 World Group II.

Russia vs. Belarus

Spain vs. Italy

Romania vs. Germany

Australia vs. United States

References 

World Group Play-offs